Eschscholzia hypecoides is a species of poppy known by the common name San Benito poppy.

Distribution
The wildflower is endemic to California where it is mainly limited to the Inner Southern California Coast Ranges, in and around San Benito County. It is a plant of oak woodlands, grassland slopes, and chaparral habitats.

This wildflower was once considered a variety of the endemic tufted poppy (Eschscholzia caespitosa).

Description
Eschscholzia hypecoides is an annual herb with leaves made up of rounded segments and producing fuzzy stems up to 30 centimeters tall.

Atop the thin, erect stems are bright yellow to orange poppy flowers. Each flower has petals one or two centimeters long and sometimes spotted with a darker shade of yellow or orange.

The fruit is a capsule 3 to 7 centimeters long containing tiny netted brown seeds.

References

External links
CalFlora Database: Eschscholzia hypecoides (Leafy stemmed Poppy,  San Benito poppy)
 Jepson Manual eFlora (TJM2) treatment of Eschscholzia hypecoides
USDA Plants Profile for Eschscholzia hypecoides
UC Photos gallery — Eschscholzia hypecoides

hypecoides
Endemic flora of California
Natural history of the California chaparral and woodlands
Natural history of the California Coast Ranges
Endemic flora of the San Francisco Bay Area
Flora without expected TNC conservation status